Neil Besanko (born 28 April 1951) is a former Australian rules footballer who played for St Kilda and Essendon in the Victorian Football League (VFL).

Besanko was a regular fixture in the St Kilda defence during the 1970s. Nicknamed 'Racehorse' as he was also a professional sprinter, Besanko played in the 1971 VFL Grand Final with St Kilda. In 1978 he moved on to Essendon and he was joined there by his brother Barry in the 1980 season. He retired in 1981 after 184 league games.

References 
 Holmesby, Russell and Main, Jim (2007). The Encyclopedia of AFL Footballers. 7th ed. Melbourne: Bas Publishing.

External links
 

1951 births
Living people
Australian rules footballers from Victoria (Australia)
St Kilda Football Club players
Essendon Football Club players